Arthur Evans (1851–1941) was an English archaeologist.

Arthur Evans may also refer to:

Politicians and activists
Arthur "Slim" Evans (1890–1944), Canadian trade unionist leader in Canada and the USA
Arthur Evans (physician) (1920–2009), American Quaker war tax resister and peace activist
Arthur Evans (politician) (1898–1958), British National Liberal and Conservative MP for Cardiff South, 1931–1945

Sports competitors
Arthur Evans (cricketer) (1871–1950), Australian cricketer
Arthur Evans (footballer, born 1868) (1868–after 1898), English goalkeeper for Stoke FC during 1890s
Arthur Evans (footballer, born 1933), English goalkeeper of the 1950s
Arthur Evans (rower) (born 1947), American Olympic rower
Arthur Evans (1903–1952), Welsh miner, boxer and rugby union/league footballer nicknamed Candy Evans
Art Evans (baseball) (1911–1952), American Major League pitcher

Writers and scholars
Arthur Evans (author) (1942–2011), American gay rights activist; author of Witchcraft and the Gay Counterculture
Arthur Benoni Evans (1781–1854), English scholarly writer and poet
Arthur Charles Evans (1916–2011), English author of Sojourn in Silesia: 1940–1945
A. Grant Evans (1858–1929), American educationalist; second president of University of Oklahoma
Arthur Humble Evans (1855–1943), English ornithologist
Arthur V. Evans (born 1956), American zoologist and author
Arthur Wade-Evans (1875–1964), Welsh clergyman and historian

Others
Arthur Evans (VC) (1891–1936), British soldier awarded the Victoria Cross
Arthur Reginald Evans (1905–1989), Australian army officer
Art Evans (actor) (born 1942), American actor

See also
Arthur Evans Moule (1836–1918), English missionary to China